Gustav Rune Åhlund (31 August 1930 – 8 February 2019) was a Swedish long-distance runner. He competed in the men's 5000 metres at the 1956 Summer Olympics.

References

External links

1930 births
2019 deaths
Athletes (track and field) at the 1956 Summer Olympics
Swedish male long-distance runners
Olympic athletes of Sweden